Country Code: +500
International Call Prefix: 00

National Significant Numbers (NSN): five digits.

Format: +500 YYXXX

Allocations

See also
Telephone numbers in the United Kingdom

References

Falkland Islands, The
Communications in the Falkland Islands